"Gold Stick" is the first episode of the fourth series of the historical series, The Crown.
It, along with the season in its entirety, was released on 15 November 2020. It was written by series creator and executive producer Peter Morgan, and directed by executive producer Benjamin Caron.

Starring in this episode are returning cast Olivia Colman as Queen Elizabeth II, Tobias Menzies as Prince Philip, Duke of Edinburgh, Helena Bonham Carter as Princess Margaret, Josh O'Connor as Prince Charles, Marion Bailey as Queen Elizabeth The Queen Mother and Erin Doherty as Princess Anne, all of whom have reprised their roles from the previous season.

Joining cast members include Gillian Anderson as Margaret Thatcher, Emma Corrin as Lady Diana Spencer and Stephen Boxer as Denis Thatcher. Charles Dance makes his final appearance in this episode as Lord Mountbatten.

For their performances in this episode, Menzies and Dance were nominated for the Primetime Emmy Award for Outstanding Supporting Actor in a Drama Series and the Primetime Emmy Award for Outstanding Guest Actor in a Drama Series respectively, with Menzies winning the award.

Plot
The episode begins with the 1979 Trooping the Colour. Charles, Prince of Wales, meets a young Diana Spencer at her family home in Sandringham whilst picking up her elder sister Sarah, to go on a date. Margaret Thatcher's  Conservative Party win the 1979 election, and she becomes the first female Prime Minister of the United Kingdom. During her first private audience with Queen Elizabeth II, Elizabeth assumes that Thatcher will fill her first cabinet with women. Thatcher rebuffs this idea because of her view that women "are generally not suited to high office".

The Royal family travel to Balmoral Castle. Princess Anne is considering retiring from her career as a professional showjumper, but Prince Philip attempts to talk her out of it. Lord Mountbatten is holidaying with his family at Classiebawn Castle in County Sligo, Ireland. Mountbatten makes a telephone call to Charles, who is also on holiday with friends in Iceland. Mountbatten requests to meet him in London, but Charles rejects as he will be spending time with Camilla Parker Bowles, which results in an argument because of Mountbatten's views against her. Mountbatten writes a letter to Charles before joining his family on their boat to go lobster fishing. As their boat travels slightly from the coast, it explodes after a bomb was planted on it by members of the IRA, killing Mountbatten, one of his grandsons, and the boat boy. The Royal family and Thatcher are informed of his death.

Charles reads the contents of Mountbatten's letter, writing critically of his affair with the married Camilla and instructing him to find a suitable wife, whom the public will love as a princess and, in due course, as queen consort. In a telephone call with Elizabeth, Thatcher promises to defeat the IRA.  As part of a detailed set of instructions for his own funeral, Mountbatten specified that Charles should deliver the reading. A jealous and inebriated Philip tells Charles that Mountbatten was like a father to him, and expresses bitterness at having been replaced by Charles. As Mountbatten's funeral goes ahead at Westminster Abbey, the IRA declares war on Britain.

Anne competes in the 1979 Badminton Horse Trials, riding on Elizabeth's horse, Goodwill, finishing in sixth place. Charles meets Diana again at Badminton, who passes on her condolences about Mountbatten and praises him for eulogising his funeral. Charles telephones Sarah, requesting her permission to ask Diana on a date, which she grants. Diana, now living in a flat in Earls Court with her friends, travels back to Sandringham to meet Charles.

Production
"Gold Stick" was written by the series creator and executive producer, Peter Morgan, and directed by Benjamin Caron. It is the first episode in the fourth series and the tenth episode overall directed by Caron.

In April 2019, Emma Corrin was cast as Lady Diana Spencer for the fourth season. In September 2019, Gillian Anderson, who had been rumoured since that January to be in talks to portray Margaret Thatcher in the fourth season, was officially confirmed for the role.

Reception and trivia
The episode title references Lord Mountbatten's position as Regimental Colonel of the Life Guards, one of the two Household Cavalry units charged with protecting the Queen, and the nickname associated with the gold-headed stick that the Colonel carries as well as Lord Mountbatten's personal relationship with the Royal Family, particularly Princes Philip and Charles.

In a four-star rating by Sarene Leeds of Vulture.com, she wrote that the episode's opening seemed "fitting for 2020" because of it being "resoundingly bleak." She describes the Queen as being "steadfast" and having "learned very little" regarding her children's personal and love lives.

References

2020 American television episodes
2020 British television episodes
The Crown (TV series) episodes
Fiction set in 1979
Television episodes about assassinations
Television episodes set in Scotland
Television episodes set in the Republic of Ireland